The year 1684 in science and technology involved some significant events.

Astronomy
 December 10 – Edmond Halley presents the paper De motu corporum in gyrum, containing Isaac Newton's derivation of Kepler's laws of planetary motion (incorporating inverse-square force) from his theory of gravity, to the Royal Society in London.

Mathematics
 Gottfried Leibniz publishes the first account of differential calculus.

Publications
 Robert Boyle publishes Experiments and Considerations about the Porosity of Bodies, the first work on this topic.
 Raymond Vieussens publishes Neurographia universalis, a "pioneering work" on the nervous system.

Births
 Celia Grillo Borromeo, Italian scientist and mathematician (died 1777)

Deaths
 April 5 – William Brouncker, 2nd Viscount Brouncker, English mathematician (born 1620)
 May 11 – Daniel Whistler, English physician (born c. 1619)
 May 12 – Edme Mariotte, French physicist known for his recognition of Boyle's law (born 1620)
 October – Dud Dudley, English metallurgist (born 1600?)

References

 
17th century in science
1680s in science